Skalon is a Russian-language surname of French origin. Notable persons with the surname include:

 Georgi Skalon (1847-1914), a Russian Empire general
 Anton Skalon (1767-1812), Russian Empire general 
 Vasily Skalon (1846 — 1907), Russian writer, journalist, and political activist
 Vasily N. Skalon (1903 - 1976), Russian ornithologist, zoologist and conservationist

Russian-language surnames